The Australian marbled catshark (Atelomycterus macleayi) is a catshark of the family Scyliorhinidae, found in the eastern Indian Ocean, endemic to Western Australia between latitudes 12 and 21°S, from the surface to  deep. Its length is up to 60.0 cm (23 inches), and it typically inhabits coastal waters with sandy or rocky bottoms.

References

 

Australian marbled catshark
Marine fish of Northern Australia
Australian marbled catshark